Luxembourg 1. Division is the third level in the league system of Luxembourg football.

The competition
There are 32 clubs in 1. Division, divided in two groups of 16 teams. At the end of each season the three lowest placed teams of each group are relegated to 2. Division and the six winning teams from the two 3. Division leagues are promoted in their place. The top team in each 1. Division group is promoted to Luxembourg Division of Honour and the two lowest placed teams from Luxembourg Division of Honour are relegated in their place. The second placed teams in each 1. Division group plays a promotion/relegation play-off against the third and fourth lowest teams in Luxembourg Division of Honour.

2021–22 clubs

The clubs competing in the 2021–22 season are listed below.

1. Division Serie 1

1. Division Serie 2

Previous winners

References
Serie 1 fixtures, results and standings by the Luxembourg Football Federation
Serie 2 fixtures, results and standings by the Luxembourg Football Federation
1. Division at Soccerway

3
Third level football leagues in Europe